Winsham is a village and civil parish  south-east of Chard and  from Crewkerne, in the South Somerset district of Somerset, England.

Administratively it is in Area West, South Somerset District Council, and has a Parish Council elected by residents. Winsham Parish Council was one of the first to be formed in 1894, shortly after the passing of the Local Government Act of the same year.

History
The name Winsham means Wine's settlement.

In Saxon times the manor formed part of the estate of Wells Cathedral. The parish of Winsham was part of the Kingsbury Hundred.

With its roots in Saxon times, and its listing in the Domesday Book. Three estates had a major influence on Winsham's rural community Forde Abbey, Cricket St Thomas and Leigh House. The Fry family, the chocolate manufacturers from Bristol, who owned the Cricket St Thomas estate from 1897 until 1919, and the Hall family who followed them were particularly active in their support of the village.

The same is true of Leigh House where the Henley and Davies family also played an active part in village affairs. In the nineteenth century, the West of England Woollen Mill employed large numbers (said to be 600 at its peak).  During that time it is believed that the population of Winsham increased to over a thousand. This boom was over by 1850, when the mill closed, having lost its business to the north of England. At a later date, it continued on reduced scale processing jute until the early twentieth century.

Both the village Pub, ’The Bell’, and the village run general store and Post Office have been in continuous business since at least 1850. Also in the centre of the village is the village hall, a gift to the village from Lord Bridport in 1887 to celebrate the Golden Jubilee of Queen Victoria.  It is known as the Jubilee Hall.

The village school building dates back to 1818.

A more recent structure is the Sports and Social Club (with changing rooms), located on the larger of two recreation grounds near to the centre of the village. This building and the Upper Recreation Ground is managed by the Winsham Playing Fields Charity on a 99 year lease from Winsham Parish Council (dated 1968).  The Charity is legally responsible for all the maintenance, upkeep and insurance of the Upper Rec and the Clubhouse.  The 'Upper Rec' hosts various events such as the Annual Horticultural Show. It is also home to Winsham United Football Club which has been active since the late 19th Century.

Governance
The parish council has responsibility for local issues, including setting an annual precept (local rate) to cover the council’s operating costs and producing annual accounts for public scrutiny. The parish council evaluates local planning applications and works with the local police, district council officers, and neighbourhood watch groups on matters of crime, security, and traffic. The parish council's role also includes initiating projects for the maintenance and repair of parish facilities, as well as consulting with the district council on the maintenance, repair, and improvement of highways, drainage, footpaths, public transport, and street cleaning. Conservation matters (including trees and listed buildings) and environmental issues are also the responsibility of the council.  In September 2017 the Parish Council was awarded Foundation status by the National Association of Local Councils for demonstrating excellent governance, development of councillors and employees, and good engagement.  Sadly in May 2019, following the local elections, 8 new councillors and a new clerk took post, meaning that the Parish Council lost the right to use the Foundation Certificate and the General Power of Competence.

The village falls within the Non-metropolitan district of South Somerset, which was formed on 1 April 1974 under the Local Government Act 1972, having previously been part of Chard Rural District. The district council is responsible for local planning and building control, local roads, council housing, environmental health, markets and fairs, refuse collection and recycling, cemeteries and crematoria, leisure services, parks, and tourism.

Somerset County Council is responsible for running the largest and most expensive local services such as education, social services, libraries, main roads, public transport, policing and  fire services, trading standards, waste disposal and strategic planning.

The village is in the 'Windwhistle' electoral ward. Winsham is the most populous area in the ward but this stretches east to West Crewkerne and north to Dowlish Wake. The total population of the ward taken from the 2011 census was 2,293.

It is also part of the Yeovil county constituency represented in the House of Commons of the Parliament of the United Kingdom. It elects one Member of Parliament (MP) by the first past the post system of election.

Religious sites

The Church of St Stephen originates from the 13th century, though mostly 15th century with 19th century restoration. Designated by English Heritage as a Grade II* listed building. St. Stephen's is an historically important site which attracts many visitors from around the world - it contains a pre-Reformation tympanum (rood screen) of the Crucifixion, and is only one of two to survive anywhere.  It also has a copy of Fox's Book of Martyrs, and other interesting features.

The United Reformed Church dates back to the early 19th Century. Non-conformism has  had a substantial following in the parish since the 17th Century. A number of fascinating historical documents relating to the URC in Winsham can be found on the Winsham Web Museum.

References

External links

 Winsham Web Museum
 Winsham Parish Council Website
 Winsham Parish Web site

Villages in South Somerset
Civil parishes in Somerset